Mewen Tomac (born 11 September 2001) is a French swimmer. He competed in the men's 100 and 200 metre backstroke event at the 2020 European Aquatics Championships, in Budapest, Hungary and in the 2020 Tokyo Summer Olympic Games.

References

External links
 

2001 births
Living people
French male backstroke swimmers
Swimmers at the 2020 Summer Olympics
Olympic swimmers of France
Sportspeople from Évreux
European Aquatics Championships medalists in swimming
21st-century French people